Brent Matich (born December 5, 1966) is a former Canadian football punter who played eight seasons for the Calgary Stampeders and Saskatchewan Roughriders.

References

External links 
Career stats

1966 births
Living people
Calgary Dinos football players
Calgary Stampeders players
Canadian football punters
Players of Canadian football from Alberta
Saskatchewan Roughriders players
Canadian football people from Calgary